Red Mountain is located in the northern Teton Range in the U.S. state of Wyoming. The peak is on the border of Grand Teton National Park and the Jedediah Smith Wilderness of Caribou-Targhee National Forest.

References

Mountains of Grand Teton National Park
Mountains of Wyoming
Mountains of Teton County, Wyoming